Allan Fitzroy Rae (30 September 1922 – 27 February 2005) was a Jamaican cricketer who played as a batsman. Rae featured in 15 Test matches between 1948 and 1953 for the West Indies cricket team.

Early Days
Rae attended Wolmer's Schools. In June 1988 he was celebrated on the $4 Jamaican stamp alongside the Barbados Cricket Buckle.

Test career
Allan Rae was a specialist batsman, who made just over 1,000 Test runs in his five-year career, including four centuries. He also had a famous opening partnership alongside Trinidadian batsman Jeffrey Stollmeyer with the duo averaging a lofty 71 in their 13 tests as a pair. His Test batting average of 46.18 was considerably higher than his first-class average of 39.65, despite his 17 centuries at first-class level and a highest score of 179. He later became president of the West Indies Cricket Board from 1981 to 1988. His father, Ernest Rae, toured England with the West Indies team in 1928.

Domestic career
Rae was also the first batsman to score a century in each innings of a West Indian first class cricket tournament.

References 

1922 births
2005 deaths
Jamaican cricketers
West Indies Test cricketers
Cricketers from Kingston, Jamaica
Jamaica cricketers